Bridelia ovata is a species of flowering plant in the family Phyllanthaceae, native from Indo-China to west Malesia. It was first described by Joseph Decaisne in 1834.

Distribution
Bridelia ovata is native to the Andaman Islands, Cambodia, Java, the Lesser Sunda Islands, Malaya, Myanmar, Sumatra, Thailand and Vietnam.

Conservation
Bridelia kurzii was assessed as "vulnerable" in the 1998 IUCN Red List, where it is said to be native only to the Nicobar Islands and the Andaman Islands. , this species was regarded as a synonym of Bridelia ovata, which has a wider distribution.

References

ovata
Flora of the Andaman Islands
Flora of Cambodia
Flora of Java
Flora of the Lesser Sunda Islands
Flora of Malaya
Flora of Myanmar
Flora of Sumatra
Flora of Thailand
Flora of Vietnam
Plants described in 1834